Revolutionary Mariateguist Party (in Spanish: Partido Mariateguista Revolucionario), was a political party in Peru founded in 1989, through a split in the Mariateguist Unified Party (PUM). Leaders of PMR included Agustín Haya de la Torre, Santiago Pedráglio and Miguel Azcueta. It contested on the lists of IU in the municipal elections 1989 and the general elections 1990. Later PMR was dissolved in internal strife. One sector integrated itself into the Democratic Left Movement (MDI).
Political parties established in 1989
Communist parties in Peru